Tiki Taane (born 17 December 1976) is a New Zealand-based musician, experimentalist, musical activist, producer, and live engineer. He was a member of leading New Zealand band Salmonella Dub but left after eleven years on 1 January 2007 to pursue a solo career. His debut album, Past, Present, Future, was released on 22 October 2007 in New Zealand and has since gone two times platinum, achieving a number one single, "Always on My Mind", which became the first digital single to reach platinum sales and also held the record by staying in the NZ Top 40 Charts for 55 weeks. Taane is also the exclusive live sound engineer for New Zealand drum and bass act Shapeshifter since their first gig in 1999. Taane has also produced multi platinum albums for bands such as Six60, Shapeshifter, Salmonella Dub and Tiki Taane.

History
Taane was born on 17 December 1976. In 1996, he was asked to become live soundman to Christchurch band Salmonella Dub, who were near becoming one of New Zealand's most popular acts. Through this role, he began to earn himself a reputation for his ability to bring a powerful live sound to using a variety of equipment at a diverse set of venues.

During this time, he stopped playing regularly with metal bands he had previously been associated with, Cultivation and Braaspadeak.  While on tour with Salmonella Dub, Taane had composed a dub-reggae track in his hotel room. Once he shared it with the group, they recorded it straight away. Taane and his whānau and friends set to work making a music video featuring Taane on tour at The Gathering that year. This track, "For the Love of It", shot into the New Zealand charts and became a summertime anthem. He became faced with not only being soundman for the band, but also that he was expected to perform his hit song at Salmonella Dub's live performances.

In both 1998 and 1999, Taane won the Best Live Audio Engineer award at the NZ bNet awards and though in popular demand, it was clear that his success lay with his friends Salmonella Dub. Also winning an award for Best Song for 'For the Love of It', Taane's confidence grew in his song-writing abilities and so he went on to create more hits.  By 2000, Taane was beginning to spend the majority of the Dub gigs mixing the first part of the set, then jumping on stage to perform.
Salmonella Dub went on to tour extensively, mainly Australia, UK and Europe, cutting their way through festivals and sell out shows while setting up a touring circuit which would be later used by other up and coming New Zealand acts.

Taane played his final gig with Salmonella Dub on New Year's Eve 2006.

Describing his decision to leave Salmonella Dub, Taane said, "I felt like it was time to take a break from Salmonella Dub." He described his time since leaving Salmonella Dub as "very lonely" and "very intense". Describing the band in an interview after the release of his album, Taane said, "I have so much love and respect for (Salmonella Dub) because if it wasn't for them I wouldn't be where I am now. I wouldn't be here."

Past, Present, Future
His debut solo record Past, Present, Future was released 22 October 2007 and debuted at #9.
The album's first official solo single, "Always on My Mind", was released 28 April 2008. The song has been certified 2× Platinum and made it to #1 in New Zealand, knocking Chris Brown off the top spot after a seven-week reign. The song spent nineteen non-consecutive weeks in the top ten, including two weeks at number one, and a total of 55 weeks in the chart so far which holds the record for being in the charts the longest. "Always on My Mind" has also become the most successful single of all time in New Zealand, landing at number one on the Best of All Time Singles Chart, a chart that has been tracking singles since 1994. The title was previously held by "Bathe in the River" by Hollie Smith.

Past, Present, Future has also been certified Platinum in New Zealand and peaked at number four. The album was certified 2× Platinum after fifty-five weeks, selling over 30,000 copies. It has so far spent over sixty-six weeks in the chart.

Use of music by Pete Bethune
Before taking out his vessel Ady Gil on an anti-whaling "cruise" to the Southern Ocean with an international marine conservation organisation, Pete Bethune noted that he had installed a large set of speakers, and intended to play songs like "Tangaroa" from Tiki Taane to the whalers, describing it as a "growling big sort of a song about the God of the Sea who looks after us."

Legal issues
On 10 April 2011, Taane was arrested on charges of "disorderly behaviour likely to cause violence to start or continue" while performing "Fuck tha Police" by American group N.W.A at a gig in Tauranga. On his web site, Taane posted the message, "Freedom of speech is a human right" Tiki later stated that he "loves police" and was "not angry with them" even though the arrest goes against the NZ Bill of Rights Act 1990. Taane said that "the song is about corrupt Police who abuse their position of power for their own agendas, and to be arrested for singing it is very ironic."

On 13 April Tiki told Marcus Lush on Radio Live that the lyrics often feature in his performances and his arrest came as a complete surprise, considering there was no trouble or violence within the concert. The arrest created a debate about freedom of speech that became political when Tauranga MP Simon Bridges said "Tiki Taane is a disgrace and I hope he never plays Tauranga again." Senior police stated they supported the arresting officers actions, and are confident they acted appropriately. But in early September, the charges against Taane were dropped by police, calling the incident a "misunderstanding" after mediation; charges remained against promoter Patricio Alvarez-Riveros from the same incident. Taane later invited the Tauranga Police to perform with him at the 2011 Vodafone NZ Music Awards at Auckland's Vector Arena, where he was nominated for three awards & won, but they declined. Taane was instead given permission by the Police to borrow 4x Police issued uniforms to be used in his awards performance in which Taane's friends dressed up to re-enact the controversial arrest.

Music timeline

Discography

Albums

Singles

Guest appearances 

Notes

References and notes

 Tiki Taane inthemix.com.au Interview
 Tiki Taane Bebo Fansite
 Tiki Taane Profile, Muzic.net.nz
 Past, Present, Future at Real Groovy

External links

 

1976 births
Living people
New Zealand musicians
Ngāti Maniapoto people
New Zealand Māori musicians
Experimental musicians
Drum and bass musicians
The Adults members
Māori-language singers